The Darling of the Rich is a 1922 American silent drama film directed by John G. Adolfi and starring Betty Blythe, Gladys Leslie, and Montagu Love.

Cast
 Betty Blythe as Charmion Winship 
 Gladys Leslie as Lizzie Callahan 
 Jane Jennings as Jane Winship 
 Montagu Love as Peyton Martin 
 Charles K. Gerrard as Torrence Welch 
 Leslie Austin as Mason Lawrence 
 Julia Swayne Gordon as Dippy Helen 
 Albert Hackett as Fred Winship 
 Walter Walker as Mike Callahan 
 A. Gowin as Detective 
 Rita Maurice as The Baby

See also 
 (1918)
A Daughter of Luxury (1922)

References

Bibliography
 Munden, Kenneth White. The American Film Institute Catalog of Motion Pictures Produced in the United States, Part 1. University of California Press, 1997.

External links

1922 films
1922 drama films
Silent American drama films
Films directed by John G. Adolfi
American silent feature films
1920s English-language films
American black-and-white films
Remakes of American films
American films based on plays
1920s American films